A teja is a dumpling-shaped confection from the Ica Region of Peru. It contains manjar blanco filling (similar to dulce de leche) and either dried fruits or nuts. The exterior is usually a sugar-based fondant-like shell, but there also exists chocolate versions too (known by the blend chocotejas).

References

External links
 Helena Chocolatier is a major manufacturer of tejas.

Confectionery
Latin American cuisine
Peruvian cuisine
Spanish cuisine